Soul Man is an American sitcom starring Dan Aykroyd that aired on ABC from April 15, 1997 to May 26, 1998. A total of 25 half-hour episodes were produced over two seasons.

The series premiered on April 15, 1997, and was picked up for a second season of 22 half-hour episodes after only three episodes aired for the first season. Despite ranking 29th in its 2nd and final season, it ended on May 26, 1998, with 25 half-hour episodes produced in total. A four-year-old Spencer Breslin made his TV debut and was a series regular for the three-episode-long 1997 first season, in which he played the youngest child of Aykroyd.

The theme song was "Soul Man" written by Isaac Hayes and David Porter. Aykroyd was closely associated with the song, having released a hit single of it in 1979 with his band The Blues Brothers.

Premise
Mike Weber (played by Aykroyd) is a widowed Episcopal priest who must deal with his four children, his quirky parishioners in Royal Oak, Michigan, and a wet-behind-the-ears curate who happens to be the nephew of his bishop.

Cast

Dan Aykroyd as Rev. Mike Weber
Anthony Clark as Rev. Todd Tucker
Courtney Chase as Meredith Weber 
Dakin Matthews as Bishop Peter Jerome
Kevin Sheridan as Kenny Weber
Brendon Ryan Barrett as Andy Weber
Spencer Breslin as Fred Weber (season 1)
Michael Finiguerra as Fred Weber (season 2)

Home Improvement connection
Mike Weber appeared on Home Improvement as the priest of Richard Karn's character, Al Borland. He was hired to put in a new stand for a holy water basin in the season seven episode "Losing My Religion". Tim Taylor ended up cutting the hole too big, causing the basin to fall through the floor.

In the Season 1 finale episode "Cinderella and the Funeral", Al Borland appeared in order to fix the church's furnace. Reference was made to Tim and the holy water basin falling through the hole he cut.

Zachary Ty Bryan appeared in the episode "Public Embarrassment and Todd's First Sermon" playing Brad Taylor.

Episodes

Season 1 (1997)

Season 2 (1997–98)

References

External links
 

1990s American sitcoms
1997 American television series debuts
1998 American television series endings
American Broadcasting Company original programming
English-language television shows
Television series by ABC Studios
Television shows set in Michigan
Home Improvement (TV series)
Religious comedy television series